A bust of Christopher Columbus was installed in Detroit, Michigan, United States. The memorial was removed in June 2020.

See also
 List of monuments and memorials removed during the George Floyd protests
 List of monuments and memorials to Christopher Columbus

References

External links 

Monuments and memorials in Detroit
Busts in the United States
Cultural depictions of Christopher Columbus
Monuments and memorials removed during the George Floyd protests
Monuments and memorials to Christopher Columbus
Outdoor sculptures in Michigan
Relocated buildings and structures in Michigan
Sculptures of men in Michigan